Chang Li-chiu (born 29 February 1980) is a Taiwanese softball player. She competed in the women's tournament at the 2004 Summer Olympics.

References

1980 births
Living people
Taiwanese softball players
Olympic softball players of Taiwan
Softball players at the 2004 Summer Olympics
Place of birth missing (living people)